Acrolophinae is a family of moths in the order Lepidoptera. The subfamily comprises the burrowing webworm moths and tube moths and holds about 300 species in five genera, which occur in the wild only in the New World. It is closely related to the Tineidae family.

Genera
Acrolophus
Amydria
Drastea
Exoncotis
Ptilopsaltis

References

External links
 Acrolophidae 
 Tree of Life

 
Moth families